John Roane (February 9, 1766 – November 15, 1838) was an eighteenth and nineteenth century politician from Virginia. He was the father of congressman John J. Roane.

Biography
Born at "Uppowac" in King William County, Virginia, Roane pursued in preparatory studies as a young man. He was a member of the Virginia House of Delegates from 1788 to 1790 and again in 1792 and was a delegate to the Virginia Ratifying Convention in 1788.

He was chosen as an elector for the 1789 election from King & Queen District.  All of the 10 electors from Virginia who voted cast one of their two votes for George Washington.  5 of them cast their other vote for John Adams.  3 cast theirs for George Clinton.  1 cast his for John Hancock.  1 cast his for John Jay.  Roane was one of three Clinton Electors chosen 

Roane was later elected a Democratic-Republican to the United States House of Representatives in 1808, serving from 1809 to 1815. He engaged in agricultural pursuits before returning to the House in 1827, again as a Democratic-Republican and later a Jacksonian, serving until 1831 when he was succeeded by his son John J. Roane. He was elected to his second Convention at the Virginia Constitutional Convention of 1829-1830.

He returned to the Congress a third time in 1835, serving again until 1837. Roane died on November 15, 1838 at "Uppowac" and was interred at the family cemetery in Rumford, Virginia.

References

External links

John Roane at The Political Graveyard

1766 births
1838 deaths
Delegates to the Virginia Ratifying Convention
18th-century American politicians
Members of the Virginia House of Delegates
People from King William County, Virginia
Democratic-Republican Party members of the United States House of Representatives from Virginia
Jacksonian members of the United States House of Representatives from Virginia
19th-century American politicians